Dušan David Pařízek (10 August 1971) is a Czech theatre director, mostly working in German-speaking countries.

Life 
Dušan Pařízek was born Brno, and his family later emigrated to Germany. He studied comparative literature and theatre science at Munich University and then directing and dramaturgy at the Theatre Faculty of the Academy of Performing Arts in Prague (DAMU). In 1997 he staged the play Die Präsidentinnen (The Women Presidents) by Werner Schwab and some of his other plays in Theatre on the Balustrade. From 2002 he worked as an executive and art director of Divadlo Komedie, with a program under the strong influence of German-speaking theatre texts. In 2012 his creative team quit because of conflicts about the finances from the municipality of Prague.

Meanwhile, Pařízek directed productions in cities including Darmstadt, Cologne, Zürich, Düsseldorf, Bremen and Vienna. In 2013 he staged a version of The Garden Party by Václav Havel at the National Theatre in Prague.

Awards
 In 2015 he won the Inszenierung des Jahres (Production of the Year) award from Theater heute magazine for the best German-speaking production of the year with his production of Wolfram Lotz's Die lächerliche Finsternis (The Ridiculous Darkness) in Akademietheater, Vienna.
 2018: Nestroy Theatre Prize for Best director for Vor Sonnenaufgang

References

External links 
 (in German) Dušan David Pařízek on the webpage of Berliner Festspiele
 (in German) Dušan David Pařízek on the webpage of Schauspielhaus Zürich

Living people
1971 births
People from Brno
Czech theatre directors